Dysauxes famula is a moth of the family Erebidae. It was described by Christian Friedrich Freyer in 1836. It is found in the Transcaspian Oblast, the Caucasus, Iran, Asia Minor, Palestine, France, Switzerland, Italy, the Balkan Peninsula, Ukraine, as well as on Corsica, Sicily, Crete and Cyprus.

Subspecies
 Dysauxes famula famula
 Dysauxes famula gravis Ignatyev & Zolotuhin, 2006 (Russian Far East)

References

External links

Lepiforum.de

Syntomini
Moths described in 1836
Moths of Europe
Moths of Asia
Taxa named by Christian Friedrich Freyer